Thomas Robins is a New Zealand Producer, Director, Writer and Actor who was the original host of Squirt, a children's television series. He has also played roles in four films directed by Peter Jackson, the most notable being Déagol in The Lord of the Rings: The Return of the King.

Filmography

Television

Film

References

External links
 
 Filmography of Thomas Robins at Fandango

Living people
New Zealand male television actors
New Zealand male film actors
Year of birth missing (living people)